National Heritage Board can refer to an agency of the same name in a number of countries:

The National Heritage Board of Estonia
The National Heritage Board of Singapore
The National Heritage Board of Sweden
National Heritage Board of Poland